East Dubuque is a city in Jo Daviess County, Illinois, United States. The population was 1,505 at the 2020 census, down from 1,704 in 2010. East Dubuque is located alongside the Mississippi River. Across the river is the city of Dubuque, Iowa. The city limits extend along the river to the Illinois – Wisconsin border.

History
East Dubuque was originally called Dunleith, and under the latter name was platted in 1853. The present name comes from the city's location east of Dubuque. A post office was established at Dunleith in 1854, and the post office was renamed East Dubuque in 1879.

Transportation
The main roads in East Dubuque are Sinsinawa Avenue and U.S. Route 20 (Wall Street). The Julien Dubuque Bridge serves as the connection between East Dubuque and Dubuque. Illinois Route 35 serves as the primary connection between East Dubuque and Wisconsin.  The East Dubuque station previously provided another transportation choice for residents of East Dubuque.

Geography 
East Dubuque is located at  (42.491103, -90.641214).

Demographics

2020 census
As of the census of 2020, the population was 1,505. The racial makeup of the city was 92.5% White, 1.3% Black or African American, 0.3% Asian, 0.3% Pacific Islander, 0.2% Native American, 1.3% from other races, and 4.1% from two or more races. Ethnically, the population was 2.3% Hispanic or Latino of any race.

2000 census
As of the census of 2000, there were 1,995 people, 864 households, and 527 families residing in the city. The racial makeup of the city was 99.10% White, 0.15% African American, 0.05% Native American, 0.20% Asian, 0.20% from other races, and 0.30% from two or more races. Hispanic or Latino of any race were 1.05% of the population.

There were 864 households, out of which 27.9% had children under the age of 18 living with them, 48.1% were married couples living together, 8.1% had a female householder with no husband present, and 38.9% were non-families. 34.0% of all households were made up of individuals, and 13.4% had someone living alone who was 65 years of age or older. The average household size was 2.31 and the average family size was 2.97.

In the city, the population was spread out, with 23.3% under the age of 18, 8.8% from 18 to 24, 28.4% from 25 to 44, 23.5% from 45 to 64, and 16.0% who were 65 years of age or older. The median age was 38 years. For every 100 females, there were 105.9 males. For every 100 females age 18 and over, there were 99.2 males.

The median income for a household in the city was $35,099, and the median income for a family was $45,924. Males had a median income of $31,010 versus $19,459 for females. The per capita income for the city was $20,984. About 2.1% of families and 4.3% of the population were below the poverty line, including 3.3% of those under age 18 and 6.9% of those age 65 or over.

Notable person

 Arthur Joseph O'Neill, Roman Catholic bishop

Coach Josh White, Head Coach of the East Dubuque Crabs
Led East Dubuque to the 2022 Coosa Valley Football League Championship

Prominent landmarks
East Dubuque School
Julien Dubuque Bridge

References

External links
Official web Site
East Dubuque Library
East Dubuque School District

Cities in Illinois
Illinois populated places on the Mississippi River
Cities in Jo Daviess County, Illinois